Belezna is a village in Zala County, Hungary with 748 inhabitants (status: January 2012).

External links 
 Street map

References

Populated places in Zala County